After Carola Häggkvist's win in the 1991 contest, Sweden was the host of the Eurovision Song Contest 1992, held in Malmö. Sveriges Television, the Swedish broadcaster, continued to use the Melodifestivalen format to select their entry. 

Christer Björkman represented the country with the song "I morgon är en annan dag", composed by Niklas Strömstedt.

Before Eurovision

Melodifestivalen 1992 
Melodifestivalen 1992 was the selection for the 32nd song to represent Sweden at the Eurovision Song Contest. It was the 31st time that this system of picking a song had been used. 1,544 songs were submitted to SVT for the competition. The final was held in the Cirkus in Stockholm on 14 March 1992, presented by Adde Malmberg and Claes Malmberg and broadcast on Kanal 1 and Sveriges Radio's P3 network. Christer Björkman's result at Eurovision was Sweden's worst since 1977, until 2003 the worst result of a Eurovision host country. The show was watched by 5,376,000 people.

At Eurovision
Björkman sang 7th on the night of the contest, following France and preceding Portugal. Björkman could not, however, repeat Carola's success of the previous year, picking up 9 points and placing 22nd of 23 countries.

Voting

References

External links
Swedish National Final 1992
TV broadcastings at SVT's open archive
The year with Melodifestivalen at SVT's open archive

1992
Countries in the Eurovision Song Contest 1992
1992
Eurovision
Eurovision